Ukrainian Galician Army (UHA), was the Ukrainian military of the West Ukrainian National Republic during and after the Polish-Ukrainian War. It was called the "Galician army" initially. Dissatisfied with the alliance of Ukraine and Poland it joined the army of Anton Denikin in November 1919, was renamed the "Ukrainian Galician Army" and later joined the Red Army as the "Red Ukrainian Galician Army" in 1920. 

Soviet authorities disbanded it after part of it broke away to join the allied Ukrainian and Polish armies, followed by Ukrainian celebrations in Odessa. The Red Army shot many of its officers, while others ended up in Polish concentration camps.

Military equipment

The Ukrainian Galician Army obtained its arms from Austrian depots and from the demobilized Austrian and German troops who streamed through Galicia by the hundreds of thousands following the collapse of the Central Powers at the end of World War I.  However, the centers of Austria's military industry lay far from Galicia, and subsequent difficulty with resupply was a major factor in the Galicians losing their war against Poland.

Armed Forces

The government of the West Ukrainian People's Republic was well organized and was able to mobilize over 100,000 people by spring 1919, 40,000 of whom were battle-ready. Due to the Ukrainians' generally poor socioeconomic status, the army had a disproportionately low ratio of officers to other ranks. In the Austro-Hungarian Army, ethnic Ukrainians accounted for only two out of 1,000 officers (in comparison, Poles had made up 27/1,000 officers in the Austrian military). 

As a result, although most of the junior rank officers were Galicians the government of the West Ukrainian People's Republic relied largely on former high-ranking officers of the defunct Russian Army, such as General Mykhailo Omelianovych-Pavlenko, to take on the post of commander and general staff. It also staffed many positions with unemployed Austrian and German officers. For this reason, the German language was the easiest way for officers to communicate with each other and was the dominant language among the staff. Despite these measures, only approximately 2.4% of the army consisted of officers.  

The Ukrainian Galician Army reached its greatest strength in June 1919, when it had 70,000 to 75,000 men, including reserves. It had very limited cavalry but artillery, consisting of ex-Austrian pieces, was a strong point. The UHA had two or three armored cars and two armored trains. The UHA's air force, organized by Petro Franko (son of the poet Ivan Franko), fielded 40 airplanes, and until April 1919 enjoyed air superiority over the Polish forces.

Sich Riflemen
A former unit of the Austro-Hungarian Army, the 1st Brigade of Sich Riflemen, became the elite force of the Ukrainian Galician Army during the war against Poland. It was formed in 1914 by former members of youth and paramilitary organizations and fought in Galicia and Ukraine against the Russian Empire throughout the First World War. At its peak this brigade had 8,600 men, not all of whom fought in Galicia.

Jewish Battalion
The Ukrainian Galician Army fielded a Jewish battalion recruited from Jewish university and high school students in Ternopil and led by Lieutenant Solomon Leimberg. Formed in June, 1919, it attained a strength of 1,200 men and participated in combat against Polish forces in July 1919 and subsequently against the Bolsheviks. The battalion was decimated by a typhus epidemic in late 1919 and its surviving soldiers were subsequently reassigned to other units within the Ukrainian Galician Army.

Structure
The Army consisted of numerous military formations which later were organized into four Corps. The Corps were further divided into brigades composed of several regular military units.
 I Corps UHA
 5th Sokal Brigade
 6th Rava Brigade
 9th Uhniv-Belz Brigade
 10th Yavoriv Brigade
 II Corps UHA
 Legion of Ukrainian Sich Riflemen
 2nd Kolomyia Brigade
 3rd Berezhany Brigade
 4th Zolochiv Brigade
 III Corps UHA
 1st Mountainous Brigade
 7th Stryi Brigade
 8th Sambir Brigade
 Battle groups "Krukevychi" and "Hlyboka", reformed into 11th Stryi Brigade
 14th Brigade (later)
 IV Corps UHA
 12th Brigade
 21st Zbarazh Brigade

Territorially the West Ukrainian People's Republic was divided into three Military Oblasts centered in Lviv, Tarnopil, and Stanyslaviv, with four okrugas (districts) in each.

Members

Archduke Wilhelm of Austria, Austrian Archduke 
Petro Franko, son of Ukrainian writer Ivan Franko
Oleksander Hrekov, commander-in-chief, ethnic Russian former Tsarist general, architect of the Chortkiv offensive
Yevhen Konovalets, founder and first leader of the Organization of Ukrainian Nationalists
Mykhailo Omelianovych-Pavlenko, Supreme Commander, later defence minister of the Ukrainian People's Republic's government-in-exile
Hnat Stefaniv, commander of Ukrainian forces in Lviv and later commander of the Ukrainian army in exile
Myron Tarnavsky, supreme commander of the Ukrainian Galician Army during its successful anti-Bolshevik offensive on Kiev; court-martialed for signing an agreement with Anton Denikin
Dmytro Vitovsky, organizer of the Ukrainian uprising in Lviv and special operations formations. Later he was a member of Western Ukrainian delegation to the Paris Peace Conference in May 1919
Bogusław Shashkevych, who served as a major and commander of the 9th UGA Infantry Brigade, and later the 21st and 4th UGA Infantry Brigades
Solomon Leimberg, lieutenant of the Jewish battalion since June 1919

See also

Polish-Ukrainian war
Ukrainian-Soviet war
West Ukrainian People's Republic
western Ukraine
Austrian Galicia
Polish-Ukrainian relations

References

 
 A web site including information about the Ukrainian Galician army

Західно-Українська Народна Республіка 1918–1923. Енциклопедія. Т. 1: А–Ж. Івано-Франківськ : Манускрипт-Львів, 2018. 688 с. ISBN 978-966-2067-44-6 (Ukrainian)

Західно-Українська Народна Республіка 1918–1923. Енциклопедія. Т. 2: З–О. Івано-Франківськ : Манускрипт-Львів, 2019. 832 с. ISBN 978-966-2067-61-3 (Ukrainian)

Західно-Українська Народна Республіка 1918-1923. Енциклопедія. Т. 3: П - С. Івано-Франківськ: Манускрипт-Львів, 2020.576 с. ISBN 978-966-2067-65-1 (Ukrainian)

Західно-Українська Народна Республіка 1918-1923. Енциклопедія. Т. 4: Т - Я. Івано-Франківськ: Манускрипт-Львів, 2021.688 с. ISBN 978-966-2067-72-9 (Ukrainian)

 
West Ukrainian People's Republic
1918 in Ukraine
1919 in Ukraine
Aftermath of World War I in Ukraine
Military history of Ukraine
Military units and formations established in 1918
Military units and formations disestablished in 1919
1918 establishments in Ukraine
1919 disestablishments in Ukraine
Anti-communist organizations